Area code 352 is a NANPA telephone dialing area around Ocala, Florida. It was split from area code 904 in 1995.

It includes all of Dixie, Gilchrist, Levy, Marion, Citrus, Sumter, Lake (with the exception of Montverde, Florida), and Hernando counties, and all but the extreme north of Alachua County.  It also includes the southern and eastern tips of Bradford County, the west edge of northern Putnam County, the southwestern part of Clay County, the northeast and north central parts of Pasco county, and the Steinhatchee and Tennile communities in southern Taylor County.

Prior to October 2021, area code 352 had telephone numbers assigned for the central office code 988. In 2020, 988 was designated nationwide as a dialing code for the National Suicide Prevention Lifeline, which created a conflict for exchanges that permit seven-digit dialing. This area code was therefore scheduled to transition to ten-digit dialing by October 24, 2021.

See also

List of Florida area codes
List of NANP area codes
North American Numbering Plan

References

External links

Florida PSC map of 352
List of exchanges from AreaCodeDownload.com, 352 Area Code
 Florida's Area Code History

Telecommunications-related introductions in 1996
Alachua County, Florida
352
352
1996 establishments in Florida